Will Reichard (born January 9, 2001) is an American football placekicker and punter for the Alabama Crimson Tide.

Early life
Reichard was born on January 9, 2001, and grew up in Hoover, Alabama. Starting in 6th grade, he attended Kohl's Kicking Camps each year and was eventually their number one ranked kicker and number two ranked punter. He attended Hoover High School in his hometown, and made 27-of-29 career field goal attempts and was perfect on extra points, making all 109 attempts. As a senior, Reichard was named to the USA Today All-USA high school football team and played in the Under Armour All-America Game. The nation's top kicker according to ESPN, he received scholarship offers from Auburn, LSU, Oklahoma, Alabama, Oregon, and Georgia, committing to Alabama.

College career

2019: Freshman season
After committing to Alabama, Reichard won the starting placekicker position in training camp, and was given every kicking position to start his first career game. Playing against Duke in week one, he went perfect on 6 extra point attempts, punted twice for 81 yards, and had every kickoff result in a touchback. He missed the final half of the season following injuries, finishing the year 4-for-7 on field goals and 21-for-22 on extra points.

2020: Sophomore season
As a sophomore in 2020, Reichard played in every game, and went a perfect 98-for-98 and field goals and extra points, being only the second Alabama player in history to accomplish that feat. He was named special teams player of the week after games against Texas A&M, LSU, Mississippi State, Georgia, and Tennessee. After placing fifth in the country with 126 points scored, Reichard was a first-team All-America selection by CBS Sports and a second-team pick by The Sporting News. He also was a finalist for the Lou Groza Award, given to the best kicker in the nation. His team went 13–0 that year, and was named national champions.

2021: Junior season
As a junior in 2021, Reichard has made 10 of 13 field goal attempts and all but one of his 58 extra points. After week one versus Miami, he was named SEC Player of the Week.

References

2001 births
Living people
American football punters
American football placekickers
Players of American football from Alabama
People from Hoover, Alabama
Alabama Crimson Tide football players